Apideonas (Greek: Απιδεώνας) is a village in the municipal unit of Larissos, in Achaea, Greece. It is located in the plains near the Ionian Sea, 3 km southeast of Lappas, 7 km northeast of Varda and 33 km southwest of Patras. It had a population of 309 in 2011. The name comes from απιδιά (apidia) meaning "wild pear". The village was founded in 1924, when the government of Greece brought in forty families of refugees from Asia Minor. Before, the area was part of a royal estate.

Population

External links
Homepage of the municipal unit of Larissou 
 Apideonas GTP Travel Pages

See also

List of settlements in Achaea

References

Populated places established in 1924
Populated places in Achaea